Nanorana parkeri (common names: High Himalaya frog, Xizang Plateau frog, Parker's slow frog, mountain slow frog) is a species of frogs in the family Dicroglossidae. It is found in Tibet (China) and in Nepal, but it is expected to be found also in Bhutan and parts of India. It is the second amphibian, and the first Neobatrachian, to have its whole genome published.

Description

Genome
The genome is about 2.3 Gb in size, encoding more than 20,000 protein-coding genes.

Habitat and conservation
It an explosive breeder in streams and marshes. There are no known major threats.

References

parkeri
Amphibians of Nepal
Fauna of Tibet
Frogs of China
Amphibians described in 1927
Taxa named by Leonhard Stejneger
Taxonomy articles created by Polbot